B. S. Gnanadesikan (20 January 1949 – 15 January 2021) was a Sr. Vice President of Tamil Maanila Congress(M) and a two time Member of the Parliament of India representing Tamil Nadu in the Rajya Sabha, the upper house of the Indian Parliament. Previously he was the President of the Tamil Nadu Congress Committee from 2011 to 2014.

He died at the age of 71 in Chennai due to COVID-19.

Positions Held
 Dec. 2014 - Jan 2021: Sr. Vice President of Tamil Maanila Congress(M)
 Sep. 2011 - Nov 2014: President, Tamil Nadu Congress Committee
 Aug. 2009 - July 2013: Member, Committee on Water Resources
 Dec. 2008 - July 2013: Member, Jawaharlal Institute of Post-Graduate Medical Education and Research, Pondicherry
 May. 2008 - July 2013: Member, Committee on Papers Laid on the Table
 Jul. 2007 - Re-elected to Rajya Sabha
 Oct. 2004 - May. 2009: Member, Consultative Committee for the Ministry of Home Affairs
 Sep. 2004 - May. 2009: Member, Committee on Chemicals and Fertilizers
 Aug. 2004 - Sep. 2004: Member, Committee on Labor
 Aug. 2002 - Feb. 2004: Member, Consultative Committee for the Ministry of Finance
 Jan. 2002 - Feb. 2004: Member, Committee on Defense
 Jul. 2001 - Elected to Rajya Sabha
 1996-2002 - General Secretary and Official Spokesperson, (i) Tamil Maanila Congress (Moopanar)

References

Indian National Congress politicians
Rajya Sabha members from Tamil Nadu
1949 births
People from Virudhunagar district
Tamil Maanila Congress politicians
2021 deaths
Deaths from the COVID-19 pandemic in India